Yesufu Lumu  is an Anglican bishop in Nigeria: he is a former Bishop of Dutse, one of ten dioceses within the Anglican Province of Kaduna, itself one of 14 provinces within the Church of Nigeria.

Lumu was elected Bishop of Dutse in 1996. He died in 2018.

Notes

2018 deaths
Anglican bishops of Dutse
21st-century Anglican bishops in Nigeria
20th-century Anglican bishops in Nigeria
Year of birth missing